Hook is the name of two places in the English county of Hampshire:

 Hook, Hart, near Basingstoke, a small town and civil parish
 Hook, Fareham, near Warsash, a hamlet